Sumu may refer to:

SUMU, ICAO code for the Carrasco International Airport, Uruguay
 Sum, a type of administrative region in Mongolia, China and some areas of Russia (sometimes known as a sumu in Inner Mongolia).
 Mayangna people, an indigenous people of Central America
 Sumo languages
Sumu Wildlife Park, in the Sumu forest, Nigeria

See also